Zusha is an American Hasidic folk/soul band from Manhattan, New York. They formed in 2013 with lead singer Shlomo Gaisin and guitarist Zachariah Goldschmiedt. The band, named after Zusha of Hanipol, combines traditional Hasidic niggunim with secular styles like jazz, folk, and reggae. Their self-titled debut EP, released on October 28, 2014, reached No. 9 on Billboard's World Albums chart, while their debut full-length album, Kavana (2016), reached No. 2.

History

Origins (2013–2014)
Zusha was formed in 2013 by Shlomo Gaisin, Zachariah Goldschmiedt, and Elisha Mlotek. All three had prior music backgrounds: Gaisin was the lead singer of the Jewish rock band JudaBlue, Goldschmiedt was the lead singer and producer for the electro-funk band Ch!nch!lla, and Mlotek is the son of Folksbiene director Zalmen Mlotek and grandson of Yiddish musicologist Eleanor Mlotek.

Gaisin and Mlotek met at a Chabad house in Bowery, and both were later introduced to Goldschmiedt through a mutual friend. They began rehearsing in friends' apartments, recording their sessions via iPhone, until manager Dani Bronstein and Rabbi Avram Mlotek, Elisha's brother, encouraged them to share their music more publicly.

Zusha EP (2014–2016)
Zusha's self-titled debut EP was recorded and produced by Mason Jar Music and released on October 28, 2014, two days after the band's first show at the Mercury Lounge with Levi Robin. The EP subsequently reached No. 9 on Billboard's World Albums chart. In December, they performed at the Knitting Factory  and opened for Soulfarm at the Highline Ballroom. The EP features cover art by Hasidic expressionist artist Chezi Gerin.

In 2015, they gave a Purim concert with G-Nome Project at the Bowery Ballroom and a Havdalah concert at the Atlanta Jewish Academy. They also performed at the Kulturfest Yiddish Soul concert at Central Park's Rumsey Playfield, alongside Hasidic pop stars Avraham Fried and Lipa Schmeltzer, cantors Joseph Malovany and Yaakov Lemmer, and klezmer trumpeter Frank London. In May, they played at the Washington, D.C. Jewish Community Center as part of the Washington Jewish Music Festival.

Kavana and A Colorful World (2016–2019)
The band's first full-length album, Kavana, was released on January 5, 2016, and subsequently reached No. 2 on Billboard's World Albums chart. A music video was filmed for the song "Mashiach". The album's song "Pashut" was featured in the trailer for the 2017 film Menashe, which premiered at the Sundance Film Festival. A Colorful World, Zusha's second full album, was released on September 4, 2017. That same year, Elisha Mlotek left the group to study filmmaking.

When the Sea Split and Open the Gates (2019–present) 
Zusha's third full album, When the Sea Split, released on September 1, 2019. In 2020, the now-duo were featured on the singles "Anim Zemirot" by PORTNOY and "Karvah" by Eitan Katz, and in December they released Likavod Shabbos, a collaborative EP with singer Beri Weber. Amid a string of singles, Zusha released the EP Cave of Healing on March 14, 2021. The following year, a fourth studio album, Open the Gates, was released on January 17, 2022, featuring collaborations with Eitan Katz, Ishay Ribo, and Eviatar Banai.

Later in the year, rapper JID's single "Dance Now", from his third album The Forever Story, used a sample of "Yoel's Niggun" from Zusha's debut EP. The sample was the idea of teenage producer Aviad Poznansky, who had heard the original song from a counselor at Camp Yavneh, and Gaisin, Goldschmiedt, and Mlotek are given writing credits on the JID song.

Musical style
Zusha's music combines the wordless vocals and improvised nature of traditional nigunim with elements folk, jazz, soul, reggae, and ska. Influences cited by the band include Shlomo Carlebach, Matisyahu, Bob Dylan, Damian Marley, and Yosi Piamenta.

Hasidic influence
The band is often associated with the Hasidic hipster and neo-Hasidism movements, although they have debated the latter term, arguing that they are merely rediscovering Hasidism rather than reinventing it. They have also rejected the label of being "Jewish music", with Mlotek saying, "The music is deeper than religion. It’s deeper than a faith. I’m Jewish, but I’m a person. Let’s start from there."

Members
Current
Shlomo Gaisin – lead vocals (2013–present)
Zachariah Goldschmiedt – guitar, vocals (2013–present)

Former
Elisha Mlotek – percussion, vocals (2013–2017)

Discography

Kavana (2016)
A Colorful World (2017)
When the Sea Split (2019)
Open the Gates (2022)

References

External links 
 

American soul musical groups
Folk musicians from New York (state)
Hasidic Judaism in New York City
Hasidic music
Jewish folk rock groups
Jewish jazz musicians
Jewish musical groups
Jewish American musicians